Henry Nilsen (born 12 April 1961) is a Norwegian speed skater. He was born in Trondheim, and represented the club Kongsvinger IL. He competed at the 1984 Winter Olympics in Sarajevo.

References

External links

 

1961 births
Living people
Sportspeople from Trondheim
Norwegian male speed skaters
Olympic speed skaters of Norway
Speed skaters at the 1984 Winter Olympics